Klara Zimmergren (born 16 February 1967) is a Swedish comedian and radio talk show host on Swedish Radio P3 and since 2007 she has appeared on the SVT comedy show Mia och Klara along with Mia Skäringer. Skäringer and Zimmergren have also been involved in joint projects before on radio such as Roll On and Bossanova. Since 2009 Zimmergren also hosts the SVT programme Djursjukhuset and she has also been a judge on the quiz show Vi i femman.¨

References

Swedish comedians
1967 births
Living people